The Covenant of Religious Socialists of Germany (Bund der Religiösen Sozialistinnen und Sozialisten Deutschlands, BRSD) is an organization of German Protestants who are working for a socialist society. It was founded in 1926 and was banned during the Nazi era (1933–1945), but reconstituted itself again, after the war.

Goals 
The goals of the BRSD are the separation of church and state, the democratization of the church, the political neutrality of the church, non-denominational schools, an end of the chaplaincy and for the church to work for peace and international understanding.

Nazi Resistance 
The BRSD positioned itself squarely against National Socialism. It referred to Nazism as "pre-Christian, heathen destructive power' and criticized the ideological glorification of violence by the Nazis. As with other socialist organizations, the Federation was banned once the Nazis seized power, however, various members of the organization formed resistance groups, such as Erich Kürschner in Berlin.

After 1945 
After the Second World War, the BRSD was re-founded. The group in the Soviet occupation zone disintegrated after 1946. The organization in West Germany was marginialized because of the Cold War, but was able to revitalize itself after 1968. Today, the BRSD is a member of the Attac network, of Oikocredit, Kairos Europa, and the International League of Religious Socialists.

See also 
 Christian socialism
 List of Germans who resisted Nazism

References

External links
Official website 
Ulrich Peter.  History of the BRSD 

Christian socialist organizations
Nazi Germany and Protestantism
Organizations established in 1926
Socialist organisations in Germany